Lillie Harris (born 1994) is a contemporary British composer, copyist and engraver. Born in Canterbury, she is now based in south-east London.

Biography
Harris was a student of Haris Kittos at the Royal College of Music, graduating in 2016.

She has an interest in Baroque instruments, and in 2013 was a finalist  in the National Centre for Early Music's Composer Competition, writing her The Dahomey Amazons Take a Tea Break for Florilegium. She writes of the piece:I had written a fusion piece, melding a Baroque-style melody with the Adzogbo rhythm common across many African cultures; the percussive, ‘spitty’ and unusual sounds ended up being my favourite, as the particularly human, vocal quality of the recorder and the richer, brighter tone of the Baroque cello had a cohesiveness that I probably would not have felt had the ensemble been on modern cello and flute, for example. The piece was a fun experiment that left me eager to go further.Her 2016 work, remiscipate, reflecting the demolition of Glasgow's Red Road Flats, was commissioned and premiered by the Royal Scottish National Orchestra, and described as an "evocation of a crumbling building, through moaning trombones and tremolo strings, as well as the bleak aftermath of dust and silence." In the same year, she wrote her solo viola work, AND, for violist Katherine Wren, who subsequently performed the work in her Nordic tour of the Shetland Islands, at Soundfestival Aberdeen and at the Glasgow Royal Concert Hall as part of the Royal Scottish National Orchestra's chamber music series.

Her work, Vitreous was written for the pianist Ben Powell as part of the Psappha Composing for Piano project.

In 2017, she was appointed a place on the London Symphony Orchestra's SoundHub programme, and commissioned her piece My Last Duchess, based on the poem by Robert Browning. That year, she was also offered a place on the London Philharmonic's Young Composers Scheme, during which she worked with the composer and conductor James MacMillan.

Harris won the Tenso Young Composers Award in 2017.

She has also written reviews and articles for Revoice Magazine, and maintains her own blog, The Green Copyist, on printing and preparing music sustainably.

Selected works 
 My Last Duchess (2018) - clarinets, viola, percussion, electronic tape and poem extracts triggered by audience participation
 Recall (2018) - large ensemble
 Elsewhen (2017) - sextet
 Vernichtung-Frage-Schrei (2016–17) - a capella voices
 vitreous (2016–17) - piano
 AND (2016) - viola 
 wavelet (2016) - mixed ensemble
 remiscipate (2015–16) - orchestra
 Chrysalis (2015) - harp, live electronics, tape
 Red (2015–16) - sinfonietta
 In the Company of Nightingales (2015) - large mixed ensemble and solo baritone
 Dormientes Bestia (2014–15) - solo great bass paetzoid and electronics
 Qinah (2014) for SSATB voices
 The Dahomey Amazons Take a Tea Break (2013) - recorder, Baroque violin and cello, and harpsichord
 Lola on the Beach (2012) - cello
 Nineteen-to-Twenty-Hundred AD (2011) - strings, piano and HighC electronics

References

External links 
 Official website
 Lillie Harris on Soundcloud
 The Green Copyist - personal blog

Living people
1994 births
People from Canterbury
British women composers
Musicians from London
British classical composers
20th-century classical composers
Women classical composers
English composers
20th-century British composers
21st-century English women musicians